Papua New Guinean art has a long rich diverse tradition. In particular, it is world-famous for carved wooden sculpture: masks, canoes and story-boards. Papua New Guinea also has a wide variety of clay, stone, bone, animal and natural die art. Many of the best collections of these are held in overseas museums.

Some of the artists regarded as being in the first wave of contemporary art in Papua New Guinea are: Mathias Kauage OBE (born 1944), Timothy Akis, Jakupa Ako and Joe Nalo, all from the tough urban area of Port Moresby.  Kauage won Australia's Blake Prize for Religious Art, four of his works are in the Gallery of Modern Art in Glasgow, and he had a solo show in 2005 at the Horniman Museum, "Kauage's Visions: Art from Papua New Guinea". Other noted Papua New Guinean visual artists include Larry Santana, Martin Morububuna and Heso Kiwi.

The works shown below, in composite images, were done while the artists were visiting California but are traditional in content and medium.

The Nouméa Biennale (an art fair in New Caledonia) includes works from Papua New Guinea.

See also

Culture of Papua New Guinea
Sepik art
Melanesian art
Overmodelled skull

References

Papua New Guinean culture
Art by country